Fürstenfeld Abbey is a former Cistercian monastery in Fürstenfeldbruck (formerly known simply as Bruck), Bavaria, Germany.

It is situated about 25 km north-west of Munich. The abbey was one of the household monasteries of the Wittelsbachs. The abbey church of the Assumption of the Virgin Mary is held to be a masterpiece of the late Baroque in southern Germany.

History 
In 1256, Louis II, Duke of Bavaria (Louis the Severe) killed his first wife, Marie of Brabant (1226–1256) on suspicion of adultery (which later turned out to be unfounded), the penance for which, as imposed by Pope Alexander IV, was the foundation of a monastery. The first foundation at Seldental, at Tal near Aibling, in 1258, was afterwards moved to the present site near the town of Bruck in 1263. Papal permission for the new foundation to be settled by Cistercian monks from Aldersbach Abbey had been obtained as early as 1256, but was not confirmed by the Bishop of Freising until 1265, in which year the new abbey was at last settled. The monks actively promoted the cult of Leonard of Noblac, and his shrine at the nearby village of Inchenhofen became a major pilgrimage site. 

Louis II endowed and privileged the new abbey very handsomely and when he died, was buried here. His son, Louis IV, Holy Roman Emperor, was also a great benefactor to the abbey, which supported him in his dynastic struggle against the Habsburger Frederick the Handsome. Emperor Louis IV died of a stroke at Puch nearby on 11 October 1347 during a bear hunt, and his heart was buried here. Both men named Louis are commemorated by elaborate Baroque monuments.

In the Thirty Years' War, in 1632/33 the monastery was sacked by the troops of King Gustavus Adolphus of Sweden, and the monks fled to Munich. From 1640 however the abbey began to make an economic recovery. Under Abbot Martin Dallmayr several churches were built and the number of monks doubled.

In 1691 the foundation stone was laid of the Baroque monastery buildings, responsibility for the construction of which lay with the Munich court architect and master builder, Giovanni Antonio Viscardi.

Church of the Assumption of the Virgin Mary 
The supervision of the construction, which did not properly begin until after the War of the Spanish Succession, was the responsibility of Johann Georg Ettenhofer, who probably introduced some alterations to Viscardi's plans. In 1723 the quire was completed, and in 1741 the church was dedicated, but the remaining works lingered on until about 1780.

A number of first-class artists were employed in the fitting-out, including the brothers Jacopo and Francesco Appiani and the Asam brothers:  Cosmas Damian Asam painted the ceiling frescoes, and Egid Quirin Asam created the side altars and possibly also the design of the high altar. In layout the abbey church of Fürstenfeld follows the typical pattern of South German and Austrian churches such as St. Michael's Church, Munich, Klagenfurt Cathedral and the Academy Church of the Assumption in Dillingen an der Donau. The interior is of imposing height and width, and in spite of the lengthy construction and fitting-out period makes a very unified impression.

The church contains remains said to be those of Saint Hyacinth of Caesarea and Saint Clemens.

Secularisation and after 
In 1803, as a result of the general secularisation in Bavaria, Fürstenfeld Abbey passed into private ownership. The new proprietor was Ignaz Leitenberger, a Bohemian cloth manufacturer. The inhabitants of the town of Bruck saved the church from demolition, however. In 1816 it became the property of King Maximilian I Joseph of Bavaria and from that time forward has served as a church of the royal family.

In 1817 the Bavarian Field Marshal Prince Wrede bought up the whole monastery, in which a year later a hospital and home for invalid soldiers was opened. In 1828 a prayer room for Protestants was opened in the former chapter room. Between 1848 and 1921 the monastery buildings were used for a variety of military purposes: for example, as a base for a number of infantry and cavalry units and as a military hospital. In 1866 part of the premises, in use at the time as a hospital, to the south of the church was destroyed in a fire.

After 1918 the former service range became the property of the Wittelsbach Compensation Fund, which rented it in 1923 to Ettal Abbey. From 1921 the remaining monastic buildings were used as boarding accommodation for school children. From 1924 to 1975 various police-related institutions were accommodated here, such as the principal police training school and the training schools of the Schutzpolizei and the Landpolizei, and from 1975 the special police studies department of the Bavarian Civil Service Technical College. In 1979 the town of Fürstenfeldbruck acquired the service buildings, which they re-modelled between 1987 and 2001 into a new cultural centre for the citizens of the district of Fürstenfeldbruck.

Fürstenfeldbruck Event Forum 
Also on the historic abbey site is the Fürstenfeldbruck Event Forum in a new civic hall built next to the restored service range, where seminars, day conferences, theatre performances and many other kinds of event are held.

Burials 
 Louis II, Duke of Bavaria

Notes

Sources and external links 

  Official website
  Fürstenfeld in the Abbeys of Bavaria database
  Webcam with pictures of Kloster Fürstenfeld
  Veranstaltungsforum Fürstenfeldbruck
 Warburg Institute Iconographic Database (images of the church interior)

Roman Catholic churches completed in 1780
Cistercian monasteries in Germany
Monasteries in Bavaria
Christian monasteries established in the 12th century
1250s establishments in the Holy Roman Empire
1258 establishments in Europe
Buildings and structures in Fürstenfeldbruck (district)
18th-century churches in Germany